

Kurt Oskar Heinrich Ludwig Wilhelm von Tippelskirch (9 October 1891 – 10 May 1957) was a general in the Wehrmacht of Nazi Germany during World War II who commanded several armies and Army Group Vistula. He surrendered to the United States Army on 2 May 1945. Tippelskirch wrote several books, such as the History of the Second World War, 1951. He died in 1957.

World War II
On 5 January 1941 he took command of the 30th Infantry Division, which participated in Operation Barbarossa.

As part of Army Group North, the division prevented the breakthrough of a Soviet corps on the river Pola and then went on to counterattack. The battle lasted a week and Tippelskirch distinguished himself as commander of the division, he was awarded on 23 November, the Knight's Cross of the Iron Cross. In the winter of 1942, the 30th Infantry Division was encircled in the Demyansk Pocket, and Tippelskirch was ordered to be flown out.

In August 1942, he was assigned as the liaison officer of the Italian 8th Army near the Don river. This position was extremely difficult for Tippelskirch because he had no German staff at his disposal and the Italians were reluctant to seek advice from German officers. The Italian 8th Army was sent into the Battle of Stalingrad at the end of the year. Tippelskirch was recalled from the front in February 1943.

On 18 February 1943 Tippelskirch became the commanding general of the XII Army Corps. He retained this position until 4 June 1944, when he had to assume command of the 4th Army from General Gotthard Heinrici. Soon after, Operation Bagration against Army Group Center began on 22 June. The 4th Army was defending the Mogilev area and repeatedly requested permission to retreat. The approval came too late, but Tippelskirch along with most of the army managed to withdraw to behind the Dnieper, although 4th Army was still threatened by three Soviet fronts. The 4th Army was encircled east of Minsk on 1 July 1944, and most units of the army were forced to surrender on 8 July 1944. Tippelskirch himself was at the time outside the pocket and escaped capture.

On 18 July 1944 he suffered severe injuries in a plane crash. On 30 July he received the Knight's Cross with Oak Leaves for his achievements in the fighting at Mogilev. On 31 October he entered back into service and replaced the ailing Otto von Knobelsdorff as the commander of the 1st Army in Lorraine. On 13 December of the same year, he took over as the commander of the 14th Army during the Italian campaign. He led the 14th Army until the end of February 1945. At the end of April 1945, Tippelskirch took command of the 21st Army in Mecklenburg and Brandenburg. On 29 April however, General Gotthard Heinrici now the commander of Army Group Vistula was dismissed, and Tippelskirch was ordered by Field Marshal Wilhelm Keitel to temporarily take over command of the army group. He reluctantly did so, taking the opportunity to negotiate with the Western Allies. He surrendered on 2 May 1945 in the Ludwigslust area to American forces.

Awards and decorations
 Iron Cross (1914) 2nd Class (18 November 1914) & 1st Class (20 December 1919)
 Clasp to the Iron Cross (1939) 2nd Class (30 September 1939) & 1st Class (31 May 1940)
 Knight's Cross of the Iron Cross with Oak Leaves
 Knight's Cross on 23 November 1941 as Generalleutnant and commander of the 30. Infanterie-Division
 539th Oak Leaves on 30 July 1944 as General der Infanterie and deputy commander-in-chief of the 4. Armee

References
Citations

Bibliography
 
 
 

1891 births
1957 deaths
Military personnel from Berlin
German Army generals of World War II
Generals of Infantry (Wehrmacht)
Prussian Army personnel
People from the Province of Brandenburg
Recipients of the clasp to the Iron Cross, 1st class
Recipients of the Knight's Cross of the Iron Cross with Oak Leaves
World War I prisoners of war held by France
German prisoners of war in World War I
Reichswehr personnel
German Army personnel of World War I
People from Charlottenburg